Dardanelle Breckenbridge or Breckenridge (December 27, 1917 - August 8, 1997), was an American jazz musician known for performing with Lionel Hampton in the 1940s, and later as a solo artist under the name Dardanelle.

Biography 
Dardanelle was a talented pianist, vibraphonist, and singer who was raised in a musical family. She studied music at Louisiana State University, holding a major, and worked as a house pianist at a local radio station. By the late 1930s she started to appear professionally on the national jazz scene. During the 1940s she led her own Dardanelle Trio, with various collaborators, initially with bassist Paul Edenfield and guitarist Tal Farlow. The trio recorded much music and became a regular fixture at New York's Copacabana. During this time she was featured in the 1946 short theatrical musical “Soundies Presents Happy Cat” directed by William Forest Crouch and distributed by RCA Records. By the 1950s Dardanelle moved to Chicago and paused music in favour of raising a family.

By the 1970s, Dardanelle reappeared at the jazz scene. She relocating to the East Coast and formed a new trio including her son, the drummer Skip Hadley. Now she worked with the likes of Bucky Pizzarelli and George Duvivier, contributing on records, and appearing in a number of venues including the Carnegie Hall, until the nineties.

Discography (in selection)

Solo albums 
 1950: Piano Moods (Columbia records)
 1978: Songs For New Lovers  (Stash Records), with Bucky Pizzarelli, George Duvivier, Grady Tate
 1981: Echoes Singing Ladies (Audiophile)
 1982: The Colors Of My Life (Stash Records)
 1984: The Two Of Us (Stash Records), with Vivian Lord
 1987: A Woman's Intuition (Audiophile)

Collaborations 
 With Lionel Hampton and his Orchestra
 1946: Punch And Judy (Decca records)
 1953: Hamp's Boogie Woogie (Brunswick)
 1963: Volume 2 - October 16, 1944 – January 30, 1946 (Ajazz Records)
 1983: Leapin' With Lionel (Affinity)
 1983 Gold Braid (Audiophile) – A compilation of 'The Dardanelle Trio' 1945 World Broadcasting recordings.

References

External links 
 The mystery of Dardanelle

1917 births
1997 deaths
American jazz pianists
American jazz vibraphonists
American women jazz singers
American jazz singers
American women singer-songwriters
Women jazz pianists
People from Carroll County, Mississippi
Jazz musicians from Mississippi
Singer-songwriters from Mississippi
Louisiana State University alumni
20th-century American pianists
20th-century American singers
20th-century American women singers
20th-century women pianists